Mianeh (electoral district) is the 5th electoral district in the East Azerbaijan Province of Iran. This electoral district has a population of 185,806 and elects 2 members of parliament.

1980
MPs in 1980 from the electorate of Mianeh. (1st)
 Sajjad Hojaji
 Mosa Salimi

1984
MPs in 1984 from the electorate of Mianeh. (2nd)
 Hokollah Pezeshki
 Mosa Salimi

1988
MPs in 1988 from the electorate of Mianeh. (3rd)
 Sajjad Hojaji
 Mosa Salimi

1992
MPs in 1992 from the electorate of Mianeh. (4th)
 Jamshid Ghanbari
 Hossein Hashemi

1996
MPs in 1996 from the electorate of Mianeh. (5th)
 Jamshid Ghanbari
 Hossein Hashemi

2000
MPs in 2000 from the electorate of Mianeh. (6th)
 Mohammad Kiafar
 Hossein Hashemi

2004
MPs in 2004 from the electorate of Mianeh. (7th)
 Bahlul Hoseini
 Hossein Hashemi

2008
MPs in 2008 from the electorate of Mianeh. (8th)
 Mohammadreza Haji-Asghari
 Hossein Hashemi

2012
MPs in 2012 from the electorate of Mianeh. (9th)
 Bahlul Hoseini
 Mohammad Ali Madadi

2016

Notes

References

Electoral districts of East Azerbaijan
Meyaneh County
Deputies of Mianeh